Bloodhounds is an upcoming South Korean streaming television series directed by Kim Joo-hwan, starring Woo Do-hwan, Lee Sang-yi, Park Sung-woong, and Huh Joon-ho. It is scheduled to be released on Netflix in the second quarter of 2023.

Synopsis 
Bloodhounds depicts a story about three young people who set foot in the world of private loans in pursuit of money and get caught up in a huge force.

Cast

Main 
 Woo Do-hwan as Kim Geon-woo
 Lee Sang-yi as Hong Woo-jin
 Park Sung-woong as Kim Myeong-gil
 Huh Joon-ho as President Choi

Supporting 
 Jung Da-eun as Cha Hyun-joo
 Ryu Soo-young
 Lee Hae-yeong
 Tae Won-seok
 Choi Young-joon
 Choi Si-won

Production 
Actress Kim Sae-ron was initially confirmed to play the role of Cha Hyun-joo, but on June 2, 2022, Netflix Korea announced Kim will be removed from the series which has already been filmed, following a DUI incident. On June 2, 2022, it was reported that actress Jung Da-eun was being considered for the role of Cha Hyun-joo.

References

External links 
 
 
 

Upcoming Netflix original programming
Korean-language Netflix original programming
2023 South Korean television series debuts